A resistor–capacitor circuit (RC circuit), or RC filter or RC network, is an electric circuit composed of resistors and capacitors.  It may be driven by a voltage or current source and these will produce different responses. A first order RC circuit is composed of one resistor and one capacitor and is the simplest type of RC circuit.

RC circuits can be used to filter a signal by blocking certain frequencies and passing others. The two most common RC filters are  the high-pass filters and low-pass filters; band-pass filters and band-stop filters usually require RLC filters, though crude ones can be made with RC filters.

Introduction

There are three basic, linear passive lumped analog circuit components: the resistor (R), the capacitor (C), and the inductor (L). These may be combined in the RC circuit, the RL circuit, the LC circuit, and the RLC circuit, with the acronyms indicating which components are used. These circuits, among them, exhibit a large number of important types of behaviour that are fundamental to much of analog electronics. In particular, they are able to act as passive filters. This article considers the RC circuit, in both series and parallel forms, as shown in the diagrams below.

Natural response 

The simplest RC circuit consists of a resistor and a charged capacitor connected to one another in a single loop, without an external voltage source. Once the circuit is closed, the capacitor begins to discharge its stored energy through the resistor. The voltage across the capacitor, which is time-dependent, can be found by using Kirchhoff's current law. The current through the resistor must be equal in magnitude (but opposite in sign) to the time derivative of the accumulated charge on the capacitor. This results in the linear differential equation

where  is the capacitance of the capacitor.

Solving this equation for  yields the formula for exponential decay: 

where  is the capacitor voltage at time .

Complex impedance 
The complex impedance,  (in ohms) of a capacitor with capacitance  (in farads) is 

The complex frequency  is, in general, a complex number,

where

 represents the imaginary unit: ,
 is the exponential decay constant (in nepers per second), and
 is the sinusoidal angular frequency (in radians per second).

Sinusoidal steady state

Sinusoidal steady state is a special case in which the input voltage consists of a pure sinusoid (with no exponential decay).  As a result,  and the impedance becomes

Series circuit

By viewing the circuit as a voltage divider, the voltage across the capacitor is:

and the voltage across the resistor is:

Transfer functions

The transfer function from the input voltage to the voltage across the capacitor is

Similarly, the transfer function from the input to the voltage across the resistor is

Poles and zeros

Both transfer functions have a single pole located at

In addition, the transfer function for the voltage across the resistor has a zero located at the origin.

Gain and phase

The magnitude of the gains across the two components are

and

and the phase angles are

and

These expressions together may be substituted into the usual expression for the phasor representing the output:

Current

The current in the circuit is the same everywhere since the circuit is in series:

Impulse response

The impulse response for each voltage is the inverse Laplace transform of the corresponding transfer function.  It represents the response of the circuit to an input voltage consisting of an impulse or Dirac delta function.

The impulse response for the capacitor voltage is

Similarly, the impulse response for the resistor voltage is

where  is the Dirac delta function

Frequency-domain considerations

These are frequency domain expressions. Analysis of them will show which frequencies the circuits (or filters) pass and reject. This analysis rests on a consideration of what happens to these gains as the frequency becomes very large and very small.

As :

As :

This shows that, if the output is taken across the capacitor, high frequencies are attenuated (shorted to ground) and low frequencies are passed. Thus, the circuit behaves as a low-pass filter. If, though, the output is taken across the resistor, high frequencies are passed and low frequencies are attenuated (since the capacitor blocks the signal as its frequency approaches 0). In this configuration, the circuit behaves as a high-pass filter.

The range of frequencies that the filter passes is called its bandwidth. The point at which the filter attenuates the signal to half its unfiltered power is termed its cutoff frequency. This requires that the gain of the circuit be reduced to 
.

Solving the above equation yields

which is the frequency that the filter will attenuate to half its original power.

Clearly, the phases also depend on frequency, although this effect is less interesting generally than the gain variations.

As :

As :

So at DC (0 Hz), the capacitor voltage is in phase with the signal voltage while the resistor voltage leads it by 90°. As frequency increases, the capacitor voltage comes to have a 90° lag relative to the signal and the resistor voltage comes to be in-phase with the signal.

Time-domain considerations

This effectively transforms . Assuming a step input (i.e.   before  and then  afterwards):

Partial fractions expansions and the inverse Laplace transform yield:

These equations are for calculating the voltage across the capacitor and resistor respectively while the capacitor is charging; for discharging, the equations are vice versa.

Thus, the voltage across the capacitor tends towards  as time passes, while the voltage across the resistor tends towards 0, as shown in the figures. This is in keeping with the intuitive point that the capacitor will be charging from the supply voltage as time passes, and will eventually be fully charged.

These equations show that a series RC circuit has a time constant, usually denoted  being the time it takes the voltage across the component to either rise (across the capacitor) or fall (across the resistor) to within  of its final value.

Note that the current, in the circuit behaves as the voltage across the resistor does, via Ohm's Law.

These results may also be derived by solving the differential equations describing the circuit:

The first equation is solved by using an integrating factor and the second follows easily; the solutions are exactly the same as those obtained via Laplace transforms.

Integrator

Consider the output across the capacitor at high frequency, i.e.

This means that the capacitor has insufficient time to charge up and so its voltage is very small. Thus the input voltage approximately equals the voltage across the resistor. To see this, consider the expression for  given above:

but note that the frequency condition described means that

so

which is just Ohm's Law.

Now,

so

which is an integrator across the capacitor.

Differentiator

Consider the output across the resistor at low frequency i.e.,

This means that the capacitor has time to charge up until its voltage is almost equal to the source's voltage. Considering the expression for  again, when

so

Now,

which is a differentiator across the resistor.

More accurate integration and differentiation can be achieved by placing resistors and capacitors as appropriate on the input and feedback loop of operational amplifiers (see operational amplifier integrator and operational amplifier differentiator).

Parallel circuit

The parallel RC circuit is generally of less interest than the series circuit. This is largely because the output voltage  is equal to the input voltage  — as a result, this circuit does not act as a filter on the input signal unless fed by a current source.

With complex impedances:

This shows that the capacitor current is 90° out of phase with the resistor (and source) current. Alternatively, the governing differential equations may be used:

When fed by a current source, the transfer function of a parallel RC circuit is:

Synthesis 
It is sometimes required to synthesise an RC circuit from a given rational function in s.  For synthesis to be possible in passive elements, the function must be a positive-real function.  To synthesise as an RC circuit, all the critical frequencies (poles and zeroes) must be on the negative real axis and alternate between poles and zeroes with an equal number of each.  Further, the critical frequency nearest the origin must be a pole, assuming the rational function represents an impedance rather than an admittance.

The synthesis can be achieved with a modification of the Foster synthesis or Cauer synthesis used to synthesise LC circuits.  In the case of Cauer synthesis, a ladder network of resistors and capacitors will result.

See also 
RC time constant
RL circuit
LC circuit
RLC circuit
Electrical network
List of electronics topics
Step response

References

Bibliography
 Bakshi, U.A.; Bakshi, A.V., Circuit Analysis - II, Technical Publications, 2009 .
 Horowitz, Paul; Hill, Winfield, The Art of Electronics (3rd edition), Cambridge University Press, 2015 .

Analog circuits
Electronic filter topology